Paul Rouvray (born 18 April 1972) is a former Australian rules footballer who played with Adelaide in the Australian Football League (AFL).

Although originally drafted by Melbourne, it was at Adelaide that Rouvray played his first AFL game. An original squad member from 1991, Rouvray didn't break into the team until round 19 of the 1992 season. He was the full-back in the 1992 SANFL Grand Final for Glenelg and finished on the losing side.

Rouvray, who was also used as a wingman, made nine AFL appearances in 1993 and another 11 in 1994. He was then traded to the Sydney Swans, in a swap with Peter Caven but never earned a call up to the seniors. He finished his career at Glenelg in 1999, having played 113 games.

References

External links
 

1972 births
Australian rules footballers from South Australia
Adelaide Football Club players
Glenelg Football Club players
Living people